Dry low emission (abbreviation DLE) is a technology that reduces NOx emissions that exhausts out of gas fired turbines.

The amount of NOx produced depends on the combustion temperature.
When the combustion takes place at a lower temperature the NOx emissions are reduced.
Gas turbines with DLE technology were developed to achieve lower emissions without using water or steam to reduce combustion temperature (Wet Low Emission (WLE) technology).
WLE technology demands cleaning of large amounts of water, is heavy, takes more space and can be difficult to install offshore.
A DLE combustor uses the principle of lean premixed combustion, and is similar to the SAC combustor (Single Annular Combustor) with some exceptions.
A DLE combustor takes up more space than a SAC turbine and if the turbine is changed it can not be connected directly to existing equipment without considerable changes in the positioning of the equipment.
The SAC turbine has one single concentric ring where the DLE turbine has two or three rings with premixers depending on gas turbine type.
DLE technology demands an advanced control system with a large number of burners.
DLE results in lower NOx emissions because the process is run with less fuel and air, the temperature is lower and combustion takes place at a lower temperature.

Background for the technology

Increased focus on environmental issues led to increased research on new and better gas turbines with water and steam cooling methods in the middle of the 1970s.
The best technology could in 1980 reduce NOx emissions to 42 ppm and this was later reduced to 25 ppm.
In the 1990s ammonium and catalysators was tested and late in the 1980s the turbine producers started to develop "Dry Low Emission-technology" (DLE)
to be able to get around the technology that demanded water or steam injection.
During the next ten years the DLE technology was developed and installed in many places leading to a reduction of NOx emissions less than 25 ppm.
It is difficult to achieve less than 9 ppm NOx emissions with DLE turbines.
To achieve a reduction from 25 ppm to 9 ppm more than 6 percent air must pass through the premixer.
Newer generations of DLE burners have an extra injection leading to better control.
Additional systems like "selective catalytic reduction" (SCR) are necessary to achieve emissions lower than 2.5 ppm.
Technologies using water or steam (Wet Low Emission (WLE)) can achieve approximately the same level of NOx emissions (25–42 ppm) when they lower the combustion temperature.

Use of DLE-technology in the world
This is not a complete list, but examples of where and when DLE technology has been implemented or are planned to be implemented.

In Europe
DLE turbines were introduced offshore in Norway in 1998.
All gas turbines installed offshore in Norway after year 2000 which uses only gas as fuel are DLE-turbines.
The Kårstø facilities were planned with DLE technology.
DLE technology is used by Statoil ASA, Hammerfest LNG.
The Norwegian Storting has decided that the Gina Krogh platform shall not be equipped with DLE technology due to the fact that all off Utsirahøyden will have electrical power supplies from the mainland.

30 April 2012 a gas turbine generator with DLE technology was opened in Waidhaus in Bavaria in Germany.

In North America
In Alberta in Canada it was in 2003 planned to use DLE technology in the power supplies.

In Oceania
DLE is planned to be used in Australia.

In Asia
The Malampaya field in the Republic of the Philippines was awarded in August 1998, construction of the topside was begun in June 1999 and completed on 28 March. 2001.
The topside was equipped with the world's first RB211 with DLE technology.

References 

Petroleum technology